Now That's What I Call Music! 18 may refer to both "Now That's What I Call Music!"-series albums, including
 Now! That's What I Call Music 18 (original UK series, 1990 release)
 Now That's What I Call Music! 18 (U.S. series, 2005 release)